Santalum freycinetianum, the forest sandalwood, Freycinet sandalwood, or Iliahi, is a species of flowering tree in the European mistletoe family, Santalaceae, that is endemic to the Hawaiian Islands. Its binomial name commemorates Henri Louis Claude de Saulces de Freycinet, a 19th-century French explorer. It grows in areas that receive  of annual rainfall. Like other members of its genus, iliahi is a root hemi-parasite, deriving some of its nutrients from the host plant; common hosts include koa (Acacia koa), koaia (Acacia koaia), and aalii (Dodonaea viscosa).

Varieties
Santalum freycinetianum var. freycinetianum (Molokai and Oahu)
Santalum freycinetianum var. lanaiense Rock – Lānai Sandalwood (Lānai and Maui)
Santalum freycinetianum var. pyrularium (A.Gray) Stemmerm. – Kauai Sandalwood (Kauai)

Uses

Non-medicinal
The laau ala (heartwood) of iliahi contains valuable, aromatic essential oils.  Native Hawaiians used the wood to make pola, the deck on a waa kaulua (double-hulled canoe).  Powdered laau ala was used as a perfume and added to kapa cloth.  Between 1791–1840, trees were intensively harvested for export to China, where the hard, yellowish-brown wood was made into carved objects, chests, and incense. The iliahi trade peaked from 1815 to 1826, and stopped when no large trees were left.

Medicinal
Native Hawaiians combined leaves and bark of the iliahi with naio (Myoporum sandwicense) ashes to treat kepia o ke poo (dandruff) and liha o ka lauoho (head lice).  Iliahi shavings mixed with awa (Piper methysticum), nioi (Eugenia reinwardtiana), ahakea (Bobea spp.), and kauila (Alphitonia ponderosa) was used to treat sexually transmitted diseases.

References

External links

freycinetianum
Endemic flora of Hawaii
Trees of Hawaii
Biota of Hawaii (island)
Biota of Kauai
Biota of Maui
Biota of Molokai
Biota of Oahu
Plants described in 1827